Mind is a mental health charity in England and Wales. Founded in 1946 as the National Association for Mental Health (NAMH), it celebrated its 70th anniversary in 2016.

Mind offers information and advice to people with mental health problems and lobbies government and local authorities on their behalf. It also works to raise public awareness and understanding of issues relating to mental health. Since 1982, it has awarded an annual prize for "Book of the Year" having to do with mental health, in addition to three other prizes. Since 2008 Mind has hosted the annual Mind Media Awards, celebrating the best portrayals and reporting of mental health across the media.

Around 125 local Mind associations (independent, affiliated charities) provide services such as supported housing, floating support schemes, care homes, drop-in centres and self-help support groups. They are each governed by their own Board of Trustees and raise their own funds to deliver services, including commonly through providing services on behalf of local authorities.

History
Mind was originally known as the National Association for Mental Health (NAMH), founded in 1946 from three voluntary organisations that provided services for the "maladjusted, emotionally disturbed or mentally handicapped to any degree." The name MIND was introduced in 1972, and the lowercase version "Mind" was introduced in the 1990s.

The National Association for Mental Health was formed (initially as national Council) by the merging of the following three organisations toward the end of the second world war:

 Central Association for Mental Welfare (CAMW)
 National Council for Mental Hygiene (NCMH)
 Child Guidance Council (CGC)

The first director was Ms M. C. Owen and from 1947 the medical director was Dr Alfred Torrie. These roles were combined for Mary Appleby who took over in 1951.

The NCMH had been an organisation of psychiatrists and psychologists, while the CAMW comprised representatives of various voluntary bodies. Among other things, they helped run and monitor institutions for the mentally handicapped, and developed training for mental health professionals. They were both part of the social hygiene movement, and had advocated eugenics and sterilisation as a means of dealing with those considered too mentally deficient to be assisted into healthy productive work and contented family life.

The beginnings of the National Association for Mental Health also coincided with the development of the National Health Service and the welfare state.

In 1969, numerous Scientologists joined the NAMH and attempted to ratify as official policy a number of points concerning the treatment of psychiatric patients. When their identity was realised they were expelled from the organisation en masse. The Church of Scientology in 1971 unsuccessfully sued the NAMH over the matter in the High Court. The case was resisted by Appleby and the NCMH, and the case became notable in British charity law.

During the 1970s the NCMH became involved with the debate raised by Ann Shearer that mental hospitals should be shut. Shearer, a Guardian journalist, was joined by Anita Hunt of the Spastics Society and an architect named Sandra Franklin to create the Campaign for the Mentally Handicapped (CMH). They estimated that there were 8,000 mentally handicapped children in hospitals, and they and parent groups wanted this to end. They lobbied the NCMH but Appleby resisted their central objective, although they offered support in other areas. Appleby wanted to avoid the hospital-v.-community debate, but she saw the hospital as a focus with mental handicap able to attract separate government funding.

Mind has celebrated World Mental Health Day annually since it was first observed in 1992. This occurs on 10 October.

Paul Farmer became chief executive of Mind in 2006, moving from his position as director of public affairs at the charity Rethink. He is due to leave this post in October 2022.

In 2008 the charity Mental Health Media (formerly the Mental Health Film Council founded in 1963 following a Mind initiative) was merged into Mind, shutting down its Open Up service which had sought to empower mental health service users to speak up in their communities, and bringing with it control over its Mental Health Media Awards.

Stephen Fry succeeded Melvyn Bragg in 2011 as President of Mind.

Campaigns
In addition to its other activities, Mind campaigns for the rights of people who have experience of mental distress. Mind's current campaigns include:
 Taking care of business — tackling workplace stress, this campaign, launched May 2010, aims to make workplaces more mentally healthy.
 Another assault — exposing the high levels of victimisation and harassment experienced by people with mental health problems, and their reluctance to report abuse to the police.
 In the red: debt, poverty and mental health — exploring the impact debt has on mental health.
 Our lives, our choices — Mind is part of the national campaign for independent living. The campaign calls for an overhaul of the health and social care system.

In addition, Mind is part of the Time to Change coalition, along with Rethink. Time to Change is an England-wide campaign to end mental health discrimination.

Mind campaigns for the inclusion and involvement of (ex)users of mental health services. In its own organisation, at least two service users must be on the executive committee of each local Mind group. The charity operates Mind Link, a national network of service users, which is represented on Mind's Council of Management, its ultimate decision-making body.

For 30 years Mind has celebrated published fiction or non-fiction writing by or about people with emotional or mental distress with the annual Mind Book of the Year Award.

Since 2008 Mind took over control of the annual Mental Health Media Awards, which it renamed the Mind Media Awards. This is intended to "recognise and celebrate the best portrayals of mental distress, and reporting of mental health, in the media". However, the operational running of the Awards ceremony and the selection of judges is carried out by private company Keystone Conference & Events Management Ltd.

Within the complex debate on mental illness causality, Mind has developed a list of factors which in its view may trigger mental illness episodes.

Mind is involved in a campaign Rethink Mental Illness to reduce the stigma associated with psychiatric illness. Inspiring South East London musician Shojon's campaign "Chocolate for the Mind".

Funding

National Mind takes donations and stuff that may be able to be in use for anything, sponsorship, grants and operates charity shops across England and Wales. Each local Mind association is an independent charity responsible for its own funding, although they are provided some project funds from national Mind. The total gross income of the local associations in 2009 was £87 million which, combined with the national Mind income of £25 million, gave a total of £112 million. At least some local associations report that the majority of their income is from the British government through local governmental and NHS grants (e.g. 74%).

Mind’s national accounts for the financial year ending in March 2021 showed the charity’s total income was £58 million and expenditure was £60 million.

Mind states that, while it accepts corporate support in general, it does not accept any money from pharmaceutical companies. This policy is binding on all local Minds who are not permitted to accept sponsorship or donations from pharmaceutical companies for their own events, or for fees or expenses for attending conferences.

Partnerships
In July 2015, Mind worked closely with Ofcom on the regulator’s UK Calling campaign to make sure communications were clear and easy to understand.

See also
Centre for Mental Health
Improving Access to Psychological Therapies
Mental Health Foundation
Mental Health Providers' Forum
Nacro
Rethink Mental Illness
Richmond Fellowship
Revolving Doors Agency
SANE
Stand to Reason (charity)
Together
Turning Point

General: 
 Mental health in the United Kingdom

References

Sources

External links

 

Health charities in the United Kingdom
Health in the London Borough of Newham
Mental health in England
Mental health organisations in the United Kingdom
Organisations based in the London Borough of Newham
Organizations established in 1946
Stratford, London
1946 establishments in England
1946 establishments in the United Kingdom